Tanner Block is a historic commercial building located at Oswego in Oswego County, New York.  It was built in 1890 and is a four-story brick structure constructed in an eclectic Victorian style.  It measures 44 feet wide and 100 feet deep.  It originally housed a hardware store.  It was updated in 1926 to house a furniture store and again updated in the 1960s.

It was listed on the National Register of Historic Places in 2009.

References

Commercial buildings on the National Register of Historic Places in New York (state)
Commercial buildings completed in 1890
Buildings and structures in Oswego County, New York
Oswego, New York
National Register of Historic Places in Oswego County, New York